The 1952 United States presidential election in Colorado took place on November 4, 1952, as part of the 1952 United States presidential election. State voters chose six representatives, or electors, to the Electoral College, who voted for president and vice president.

Colorado was won by Columbia University President Dwight D. Eisenhower (R–New York), running with Senator Richard Nixon, with 60.27% of the popular vote, against Adlai Stevenson (D–Illinois), running with Senator John Sparkman, with 38.96% of the popular vote.

Results

Results by county

References

Colorado
1952
1952 Colorado elections